Petrovo Brdo is a village in the Municipality of Tolmin in the Littoral region of Slovenia on the border with the Upper Carniola region.

It lies on the road just below a pass that connects the two regions, on the drainage divide between the Bača River, which eventually flows into the Soča, and the Sora River, a tributary of the Sava River. The road through the settlement was an important throughway in the late Middle Ages. Between the First and Second World Wars, Petrovo Brdo was on the border between the Kingdom of Italy and the Kingdom of Yugoslavia and large border barracks were built there by the Italians.

References

External links

Petrovo Brdo on Geopedia
Petrovo Brdo web cam

Populated places in the Municipality of Tolmin